This is a list of events that took place in Europe in 2022.

Incumbents

European Union
President of the European Commission: Ursula von der Leyen
President of the Parliament: 
David Sassoli (until 11 January)
Roberta Metsola (from 18 January)
President of the European Council: Charles Michel
Presidency of the Council of the EU: 
France (January–June)
Czech Republic (July–December)

Events

January
10 January: Dutch Prime Minister Mark Rutte forms his fourth cabinet, almost a year after the collapse of his previous one.
16 January: 
Dimitar Kovačevski was sworn in as Prime Minister of North Macedonia.
2022 Serbian constitutional referendum, marked by a low turnout, leads to a revision of the provisions of the constitution concerning judicial power.
30 January: The 2022 Portuguese legislative election took place.

February
11 February: The Biden administration claimed that Russia now has enough troops and military equipment in place to launch an invasion of Ukraine.
21 February: Russia recognizes the independence of the Donetsk and Luhansk People's Republic. 
24 February: Russia launches its invasion of Ukraine.
27 February: 2022 Belarusian constitutional referendum
28 February: Ukraine applied for membership of the European Union (EU)

March
2 March: The United Nations General Assembly voted on a United Nations resolution condemning Russia for its invasion of Ukraine.
3 March: 2022 Armenian presidential election
10 March: 2022 Hungarian presidential election
13 March: 75th British Academy Film Awards
16 March: The inauguration of the 1915 Çanakkale Bridge.
26 March: 2022 Maltese general election

April
3 April: 2022 Hungarian parliamentary election and 2022 Hungarian LGBTQ in education referendum

July
19 July: – At least 3,600 people are killed due to extreme heatwaves hitting much of Europe, additionally causing major wildfires, travel disruption, and record high temperatures in many countries.

See also 

 2022
 2022 in the European Union
 2022 in politics and government
 2020s

References 

 
2020s in Europe
Years of the 21st century in Europe
Europe